The 47th Writers Guild of America Awards honored the best television, and film writers of 1994. Winners were announced in 1995.

Winners & Nominees

Film 
Winners are listed first highlighted in boldface.

Television

Documentary

Special Awards

References

External links 

 WGA.org

1994
W
1994 in American cinema
1994 in American television